The women's heptathlon at the 2016 European Athletics Championships took place at the Olympic Stadium on 8 and 9 July.

Records

Schedule

Results

100 metres hurdles 
Wind:Heat 1: -0.9 m/s, Heat: +1.2 m/s, Heat 3: -0.7 m/s

High jump

Shot put

200 metres 
Wind:Heat 1: +0.2 m/s, Heat: -0.7 m/s, Heat 3: ? m/s

Long jump

Javelin throw

800 metres

Final results

References

Heptathlon W
Combined events at the European Athletics Championships
2016 in women's athletics